This is the complete list of Commonwealth Games medallists in wrestling from 1930 to 2014.

Men's Freestyle

Light flyweight

Flyweight

Bantamweight

Featherweight

Lightweight

Welterweight

Middleweight

Light heavyweight

Heavyweight

Super heavyweight

Men's Greco-Roman

55 kg

60 kg

66 kg

74 kg

84 kg

96 kg

120 kg

Women's Freestyle

48 kg

51-53 kg

55 kg

58-59 kg

63 kg

67-69 kg

72-75 kg

See also

References

External links
Results Database from the Commonwealth Games Federation

Wrestling
Medalists

Commonw